Tim is the name of several inhabited localities in Russia.

Urban localities
Tim, Kursk Oblast, a work settlement in Timsky District of Kursk Oblast

Rural localities
Tim, Oryol Oblast, a selo in Dubrovsky Selsoviet of Dolzhansky District of Oryol Oblast